Gujarat Narmada Valley Fertilizers & Chemicals (GNFC) is an Indian manufacturer of fertilizers and chemicals. GNFC was founded in 1976, jointly promoted by the Government of Gujarat and the Gujarat State Fertilizers and Chemicals (GSFC).

Located in the industrial belt of Bharuch, GNFC is a major producer of urea and nitrophosphate fertilizers, neem-based products, and industrial chemicals such as methanol, formic acid, nitric acid and acetic acid. As of fiscal year 2021–22, fertilizers generated 29% of the company's revenue, while chemicals segment contributed 70%.

(n)Code 
(n)Code Solutions, a subsidiary of GNFC, produces digital certificates for the Government of India (including the digital Aadhaar card for over 1 billion Indians). The solution was the result of a partnership with Entrust.

References

External links
 

Fertilizer companies of India
Chemical companies of India
Companies based in Gujarat
Agriculture companies established in 1976
Chemical companies established in 1976
Companies listed on the Bombay Stock Exchange
Indian companies established in 1976
1976 establishments in Gujarat
Companies listed on the National Stock Exchange of India